Samira Shahbandar (born 1946) is an Iraqi former doctor and physician. She was the second wife of Saddam Hussein.

Early life 
Shahbandar was born in Baghdad, Iraq in 1946. Shahbandar was born into an aristocratic Baghdad family.

Career 
Shahbandar was reported to have had careers as a flight attendant and as a physician.

Personal life 
Shahbandar was married to Noureddine Safi, an Iraqi pilot and manager of Iraqi Airways. They have two children. Shahbandar's son is Mohammad Saffi, who was born in 1966.

In 1983, Shahbandar met Saddam Hussein, whom she reportedly had a son with. Saddam’s eldest son Uday was reported to have envied him.
Saddam Hussein forced her husband to divorce her.
In 1986, Shahbandar was married to Saddam Hussein in secret.
In the late 1980s, Shahbandar appeared in public with Saddam Hussein.

Kamel Hana Gegeo, Hussein's valet, food taster and friend, introduced Samira to him. Hussein's secret marriage took place while he was married to Sajida Talfah, his first wife. Sajida was extremely jealous and angry when she found out about his mistress, and her brother Adnan Khairallah complained. Uday Hussein, Saddam Hussein's son with Sajida, was also angry over his father's mistress, took it as an insult to his mother, and believed that his status as heir apparent was threatened. In October 1988, during a party, Uday Hussein murdered Kamel Hana Gegeo in front of horrified guests. While Saddam Hussein declared that his son Uday Hussein would go to trial for murder, Gegeo's parents and Sajida begged that Uday Hussein be pardoned.

In 2002, Shahbandar's son from her first marriage, Mohammad Saffi, a resident of New Zealand and a flight engineer with Air New Zealand, was detained in Miami, Florida due to lack of a student visa.

As of 2004, Shahbandar was acknowledged as the wife of Saddam Hussein by United Nations.

Depictions
Her character was featured heavily in the plot of BBC adaptation of House of Saddam and was played by Australian actress Christine Stephen-Daly. In the drama, Shahbandar is portrayed as a schoolteacher, the occupation of Sajida Talfah.

Possible issue
In a 2007, Al Riyadh interview, Ali Al-Nida Husein Al-Omar, chief of the Bejat subtribe of Al-Bu Nasir, was asked about Saddam's son from Samira Shahbandar. The chief replied:

See also 
 Sajida Talfah
 House of Saddam

References 

Tulfah family
Living people
Spouses of national leaders
People from Baghdad
1946 births